Thomas William Goff (6 July 1829 – 3 June 1876) was an Irish Conservative politician.

Early life
He was a son of the Reverend Thomas Goff and the former Anne Caulfeild. His paternal grandparents were Robert Goff and Sarah (née French) Goff and his maternal grandparents were Commodore Thomas Gordon Caulfeild (a son of the Ven. John Caulfeild and brother of Lt.-Gen. James Caulfeild) and Theodosia (née Talbot) Caulfield (a granddaughter of the 1st Earl of Glandore).

Career
Goff gained the rank of Captain in the 7th Dragoon Guards and held the office of High Sheriff of Roscommon, in 1858.

Goff was elected Conservative MP for Roscommon at the 1859 general election but, on petition, was unseated in March the next year on the grounds of treating.

Personal life
On 17 March 1863, Goff was married to Dorothea FitzClarence (1845–1870), a daughter of Sarah Elizabeth Catharine Gordon (a granddaughter of George Gordon, 9th Marquess of Huntly through Maj. Lord Henry Gordon) and Lord Augustus FitzClarence (an illegitimate son of William IV of the United Kingdom). Together, they lived at Oakport House in Roscommon, Ireland (inherited from his paternal grandmother's family), and were the parents of:

 Ethel Anne Goff (1864–1928), who married Henry de Courcy Agnew, a son of Sir Andrew Agnew, 8th Baronet of Lochnaw and Lady Mary Arabella Louisa Noel (a daughter of Charles Noel, 1st Earl of Gainsborough), in 1885. After his death, she married, secondly, Edmund Charrington in July 1911.
 Muriel Helen Goff (b. 1865)
 Thomas Clarence Edward Goff (1867–1949), who held the office of High Sheriff of Roscommon in 1891; he married Lady Cecile Heathcote-Drummond-Willoughby, a daughter of Gilbert Heathcote-Drummond-Willoughby, 1st Earl of Ancaster and Lady Evelyn Elizabeth Gordon (a daughter of Charles Gordon, 10th Marquess of Huntly), in 1896.

His wife died on 15 May 1870 at Brompton Crescent, Kensington. Goff died on 3 June 1876 at Rupert Street, Haymarket, London.

Arms

References

External links
 

1829 births
1876 deaths
High Sheriffs of Roscommon
Irish Conservative Party MPs
Members of the Parliament of the United Kingdom for County Roscommon constituencies (1801–1922)
UK MPs 1859–1865
Year of birth uncertain